Hydrocotyle verticillata, also known as whorled pennywort, whorled marshpennywort or shield pennywort, is a flowering plant found in South and North America and the West Indies. Its creeping habit and unusual leaves give it its common names. It grows in places that are marshy, boggy, or even wet. Hydrocotyle verticillata is used in aquaria, where it is undemanding; it does prefer a good substrate, however, and at least moderate light. It benefits from additional carbon dioxide. It is widely used as a foreground plant.

References

External links
Jepson Manual Treatment
Flora of N S Wales

verticillata
Aquatic plants
Flora of North America
Flora of South America
Flora of the Caribbean
Plants described in 1798
Flora without expected TNC conservation status